This edition, originally scheduled in November 2006 in Sri Lanka was cancelled due to the political situation in the host country. The tournament for title (involving Japan, Korea and Hong Kong), originally must also valid as final pool for 2007 Rugby World Cup – Asia qualification was transferred by International Rugby Board in Hong Kong. The rest of the tournament ("Plate" and "Shield" was played one year after in Sri Lanka.

It was the last edition of the tournament, because from 2008, it was replaced by Asian Five Nations, that merge the ARFU Asian Rugby Championship and the ARFU Asian Rugby Series

The team were divided in three divisions, according to the results of 2006 ARFU Asian Rugby Series

Tournaments

Gold 
{| class="wikitable"
|-
!width=30|Pos.
!width=100|Team
!width=30|P
!width=30|W
!width=30|D
!width=30|Lost
!width=30|For
!width=30|Ag.
!width=40|Diff.
!width=30|Points
!width=300|Notes
|-
|- bgcolor=#ccffcc align=center
|1||align=left|||2||2||0||0||106||3||+103||4|| Qualified to 2007 Rugby World Cup
|- bgcolor=#FFFFCC align=center
|2||align=left|||2||1||0||1||23||59||-36||2|| Qualified to RWC Qualif. repechage) 
|- bgcolor=#ffffFF align=center
|3||align=left|||2||0||0||2||8||75||-67||0||
|}

Plate

Pool A 
{| class="wikitable"
|-
!width=30|Pos.
!width=100|Team
!width=30|P
!width=30|W
!width=30|D
!width=30|Lost
!width=30|For
!width=30|Ag.
!width=40|Diff.
!width=30|Points
|-
|- bgcolor=#ccffcc align=center
|1||align=left|||2||2||0||0||103||13||+90||4
|- bgcolor=#FFFFCC align=center
|2||align=left|||2||1||0||1||66||32||+34||2
|- bgcolor=#ffffFF align=center
|3||align=left|||2||0||0||2||9||133||-124||0
|}

Pool B 
{| class="wikitable"
|-
!width=30|Pos.
!width=100|Team
!width=30|P
!width=30|W
!width=30|D
!width=30|Lost
!width=30|For
!width=30|Ag.
!width=40|Diff.
!width=30|Points
|-
|- bgcolor=#ccffcc align=center
|1||align=left|||2||2||0||0||98||21||+77||4
|- bgcolor=#FFFFCC align=center
|2||align=left|||2||1||0||1||27||45||-18||2
|- bgcolor=#ffffFF align=center
|3||align=left|||2||0||0||2||37||96||-59||0
|}

Finals

First Place Final

Third Place Final

Fifth Place Final

Shield 
{| class="wikitable"
|-
!width=30|Pos.
!width=100|Team
!width=30|P
!width=30|W
!width=30|D
!width=30|Lost
!width=30|For
!width=30|Ag.
!width=40|Diff.
!width=30|Points
|-
|- bgcolor=#ccffcc align=center
|1||align=left|||2||2||0||0||71||10||+61||4
|- bgcolor=#ffffFF align=center
|2||align=left|||2||1||0||1||26||39||-13||2
|- bgcolor=#ffffFF align=center
|3||align=left|||2||0||0||2||3||51||-48||0
|}

Notes 

2006
2006 rugby union tournaments for national teams
2007 rugby union tournaments for national teams
International rugby union competitions hosted by Hong Kong
2007 in Hong Kong sport
2006 in Hong Kong sport
2006 in Asian rugby union
2007 in Asian rugby union